The Theatre Development Fund (TDF) is a non-profit corporation dedicated to assisting the theatre industry in New York City. Created in 1968 to help an ailing New York theatre industry, TDF has grown into the nation's largest performing arts nonprofit, providing support to more than 900 plays and musicals and returning upwards of $1.5 billion in revenue to thousands of Broadway, Off-Broadway and Off-Off-Broadway music and dance productions.

TDF accomplishes their mission through several programs. The TKTS Booth in Times Square is the most visible of all programs. TDF has several programs that helps strengthen their mission including TDF Accessibility Program (TAP), Education Programs, Ticketing Programs and The Costume Collection.

TDF is led by Executive Director Victoria Bailey and Managing Director Michael Naumann.

TDF Accessibility Program (TAP)
TDF Accessibility Programs, also known as TAP, is Theatre Development Fund's invitation to theatergoers with physical disabilities. TAP arranges for special discount tickets in the orchestra to be made available to individuals who are hard of hearing or deaf, partially sighted, blind, require aisle seating for medical reasons, use wheelchairs or cannot climb stairs.

Autism Theatre Initiative
On October 2, 2011, Theatre Development Fund (TDF) launched a new program, Autism Theatre Initiative, to make theatre accessible to children and adults on the autism spectrum as well as their families.

The program, which is a part of TDF's Accessibility Programs (TAP), presented the first autism-friendly performance of a Broadway show with Disney's landmark musical The Lion King on Sunday, October 2, 2011. This performance was so successful that TDF's Autism Theatre Initiative presented a second autism-friendly performance on Broadway at Disney and Cameron Mackintosh's production of  Mary Poppins on April 29, 2012, and a second performance of The Lion King on September 30, 2012. Additionally, theatres around the country are beginning to see the need for autism-friendly performances in their communities as a result of this initiative.

The shows are performed in a friendly, supportive environment for an audience of families and friends with children or adults who are diagnosed with an autism spectrum disorder (ASD) or other sensitivity issues.  Slight adjustments to the production included reduction of any jarring sounds or strobe lights focused into the audience.  In the theatre lobby there were quiet areas and an activity area, staffed with autism specialists, for those who needed to leave their seats during the performance.

Downloadable social stories (in Word format), with pictures of the theatres and productions, were available several months in advance of the performances. These are designed to personalize the experience for each attendee with ASD. Tickets were offered through TDF at affordable prices.

TDF's Autism Theater Initiative (ATI)'s slate of autism-friendly performances of Broadway shows for 2013  included  ELF, The Musical on Saturday, January 5 at 2pm at the Al Hirschfeld Theatre and will continue with Spider-man Turn Off The Dark on Saturday, April 27 at 2pm (during Autism Awareness month) at the Foxwoods Theatre; and Disney's The Lion King at the Minskoff Theatre and Newsies at the Nederlander Theatre will have autism-friendly performances in the fall of 2013 (exact dates for these matinee performances to be determined). Make sure you "sign up for info on future performances" (link on the right) to be notified when tickets will be going on sale.

Access for Young Audiences
Access for Young Audiences, TAP's Arts-in-Education program, offers tri-State elementary and secondary school students the opportunity to attend accessible Broadway performances. For these mostly first-time theatregoers who are hard of hearing or deaf, TDF simultaneously provides sign language interpreting and open captioning. In 2008, TAP launched a pilot program for students who have low vision or are blind, whereby audio description is provided. These programs are offered free of cost to the school. This school year, TDF's Access for Young Audiences reached students from 35 schools in the tri-State area.

Open captioning performances
TAP performances provide the audience with an electronic text display to the side of the stage displaying what the actors are saying or singing in real time. The display also describes sound effects on stage.  TDF open captions several Broadway and Off-Broadway shows each month for people with mild to severe hearing loss.  This also provides a way for the deaf to see what is happening on the stage without always looking at the interpreter.

Sign language interpreting performances
TAP Sign language interpreting performances provides the audience with an interpreter who uses American Sign Language to describe what the actors are saying or singing, as well as sound effects on stage. TDF interprets bi-month signed performances of Broadway shows.

Interpreting for the Theatre
Interpreting for the Theatre, a one-week intensive workshop, held at The Juilliard School, was founded in 1998 to raise the level of expertise for theatrical sign interpreters from across the United States. Participants, many of whom interpret Broadway road shows in their local cities, have the opportunity to translate, rehearse and participate in the signing of a Broadway show as a final project.

Educational Programs

It is TDF's belief that future audiences are built by engaging students, first-hand, in the vital and exciting activity of the creative process, as well as providing opportunities to attend live performances of great theatre.

Introduction To Theatre
introduction to Theatre, TDF's largest arts education program, provides students with an in-depth introduction to live theatre. Each class attends a Broadway or Off-Broadway performance and participates in eight in-class workshops that include scene writing, improvisation, etc., which serves as preparation for their theatregoing experience. Introduction to Theatre currently serves 10,000 students in the NYC area.

The Wendy Wasserstein Project

Formerly Open Doors, TDF's theatre arts mentoring program, started in 1998 by Tony Award-winning and Pulitzer prize-winning playwright Wendy Wasserstein, offers small groups of high school students an in-depth introduction to live theatre and dance. Each group works with one or more dedicated theatre and dance professionals throughout the school year. Mentors have included Kathleen Chalfant, Kirsten Childs, Graciela Daniele, Scott Ellis, William Finn, David Henry Hwang, James Lapine, Lar Lubovitch, Frank Rich and Mo Rocca.

Young Playwrights (YP)
Young Playwrights is a year-long collaboration between TDF and schools. Together we explore live performance as students craft original works that are shared as staged readings Off-Broadway. Young Playwrights currently serves 700 students in New York City high schools. This has spawned two other Young Playwright programs at TDF:

TDF Young Playwrights’ Group is a year-long after-school play writing workshop for high school students who have been a part of the residency or summer programs. The group meets weekly to write, see and experience play writing. Their work is showcased each June with professional actors in an Off Broadway theatre. Members of the group see a show every month, work with guest artists, and write original plays that are showcased throughout the year by professional actors.

TDF Young Playwrights’ Summer program is a two-week play writing intensive that is open to tri-state area high school students. We welcome those with a curiosity about play writing to apply.

Introduction to Dance
Introduction to Dance gives students the opportunity to see live dance and attend workshops led by teaching artists who are professional dancers and choreographers. Each school year the students see performances by Alvin Ailey American Dance Theater, Paul Taylor Dance Company, and American Ballet Theatre.

Ticketing Programs
TDF's discount ticket services make theatre, music and dance affordable and accessible to more than two million people each year.

TKTS Discount Booths
TKTS Discount Booths offer tickets to Broadway and Off-Broadway musicals and plays at discounts up to 50% off full price tickets. Since the opening of the original Times Square TKTS Booth on June 25, 1973, over 51 million tickets have been sold, representing $1.38 billion returned to thousands of theatre, dance and music productions. TDF opened its new TKTS booth in the revitalized Duffy Square. TDF operates satellite TKTS booths at the South Street Seaport and in Downtown Brooklyn. A fourth location is now located permanently at Lincoln Center for the Performing Arts in the David Rubenstein Atrium.

TDF Membership Program
TDF Membership Program maintains a growing list of over 80,000 qualified theatre lovers who enjoy discounts of up to 70% on admissions to hundreds of Broadway, Off-Broadway, music and dance productions each year. To qualify for TDF membership, members must belong to one of the following groups: full-time students, full-time teachers, union members, retirees, civil service employees, staff members of not-for-profit organizations, performing arts professionals, and members of the armed forces or clergy. In the 2007-2008 season, TDF membership performance admissions reached over 530,000 annually and returned over $13 million to New York City productions.

Performing Arts Vouchers
TDF Performing Arts Vouchers are TDF's principal means of assisting off-Off Broadway theatre, music and dance groups by helping them build their audiences, as well as introducing thousands of students to the joy of live performance. The TDF Voucher serves as an open ticket for admissions, allowing adventurous theatregoers the flexibility to attend the performance of their choice at smaller, more experimental theatres. Last season, a total of 57,862 admissions were given to 145 different productions returning more than $300,000 to the productions.

Theatre and Dance Subsidy programs
TDF Theatre and Dance Subsidy programs are central to TDF's mission, as they marry the goals of supporting productions of merit and bringing audiences to the theatre that might not otherwise be able to attend. The Theatre Subsidy program has subsidized over 900 productions since 1968, including 30 plays that went on to win the Pulitzer Prize for drama. Last season, admissions to subsidy productions reached 63,997 for theatre and 20,217 for dance. Over $2.5 million was returned to theatre productions and $663,000 to dance productions.

Costume Collection
TDF Costume Collection houses over 65,000 costumes and accessories providing professionally designed costumes to not-for-profit organizations at affordable prices.  Their reasonable prices not only allow emerging companies to mount more professional-looking shows, they also help theatres to produce a greater number of new works by keeping production costs down. Last season, TDF's costume collection served 440 performing arts companies in 29 states—colleges and universities, middle and high schools, and community and charitable groups—who mounted 848 productions with low-cost costume rentals from the TDF Costume Collection.

Irene Sharaff/Robert L.B. Tobin Awards
TDF's Irene Sharaff/Robert L.B. Tobin Awards were founded in 1993 to pay tribute to the art of costume design. Since then, the annual award presentation has become an occasion for the costume design community to come together to honor its own. TDF's Irene Sharaff/Robert L.B. Tobin Awards honor excellence by presenting five awards: Lifetime Achievement Award, Artisan Award, Young Master Award, Posthumous Award and the Robert L.B. Tobin Award for Lifetime Achievement in Theatrical Design.

References

External links
Theatre Development Fund
TKTS

Theatre in New York City
1968 establishments in New York City
Special Tony Award recipients